Davion Davis (born October 23, 1996) is an American football wide receiver for the Birmingham Stallions of the United States Football League (USFL). He played college football for Sam Houston State.

College career
Davis played four seasons for the Sam Houston State Bearkats. He caught 40 passes for 446 yards and three touchdowns playing the slot receiver position as a freshman. He finished his sophomore season with 56 receptions for 960 yards and 10 touchdowns and was named second-team All-Southland Conference (SLC). As a junior, Davis had 78 receptions for 1,206 yards and 17 touchdowns, eight rushes for 81 yards and 2 touchdowns, and returned six kickoffs for 152 yards and 13 punts for 281 yards and two touchdowns to finish the season with 1720 all-purpose yards and 21 total touchdowns. He was named first-team All-SLC as both a receiver and return specialist and the SLC Offensive player of the year and was named a first-team All-American by the Associated Press, the AFCA and HERO Sports. As a senior, Davis caught 52 passes for 569 yards and 10 touchdowns and was again named first-team All-SLC before missing the final three games of the season due to injury.

Professional career

Minnesota Vikings
Davis signed with the Minnesota Vikings as an undrafted free agent on April 29, 2019. He was waived by the Vikings during final roster cuts, but was re-signed to the team's practice squad. Davis was promoted to the active roster on September 28, 2019, but did not appear in an NFL game before being waived on October 12, 2019. He was promoted to the active roster again on October 24, 2019, and made his NFL debut that night against the Washington Redskins. He was waived on November 12 and re-signed to the practice squad. He signed a reserve/future contract with the Vikings on January 12, 2020. He was waived on August 3, 2020.

Cleveland Browns
On July 31, 2021, Davis signed with the Cleveland Browns. He was suspended the first two games of the 2021 season for violating the NFL's substance abuse policy. After being reinstated from suspension, he was waived on September 20, 2021, and re-signed to the practice squad.

Houston Texans
On October 6, 2021, Davis was signed by the Houston Texans off the Browns practice squad. He was placed on injured reserve on December 15. He was waived with an injury designation on August 3, 2022. He cleared waivers and was placed on injured reserve the next day. He was waived off injured reserve on August 12, 2022. He was re-signed to the practice squad on October 5.

Houston Renegades
Davis was released by the Houston Renegades of the XFL on March 3, 2023.

Birmingham Stallions
On March 11, 2023, Davis signed with the Birmingham Stallions of the United States Football League (USFL).

References

External links
Sam Houston State Berakats bio
Minnesota Vikings bio

1997 births
Living people
American football wide receivers
Birmingham Stallions (2022) players
Cleveland Browns players
Houston Texans players
Minnesota Vikings players
Players of American football from Texas
People from Williamson County, Texas
Sam Houston Bearkats football players